The  is recognized as the oldest symphony orchestra in Japan. It relocated to Tokyo in 1938. As of 2005, it has 166 members.

The orchestra plays frequently at Tokyo Opera City in Shinjuku, Orchard Hall, part of the Bunkamura (文化村) shopping and entertainment complex in Shibuya, and Suntory Hall in Akasaka, Tokyo.

Conductors
 Chief Conductor: Andrea Battistoni
 Honorary Music Director: Myung-Whun Chung
 Conductors Laureate: Tadaaki Otaka, Kazushi Ono & Dan Ettinger
 Special Guest Conductor: Mikhail Pletnev
 Resident Conductor: Kazumasa Watanabe
 Associate Conductor: Min Chung
 Permanent Honorary Member and Conductor Laureate: Norio Ohga

References

External links 
 Tokyo Philharmonic Orchestra

Musical groups established in 1911
Japanese orchestras
Culture in Tokyo
Kingdom Hearts
Super Sentai
Sanrio
Hello Kitty
1911 establishments in Japan
Musical groups from Aichi Prefecture
Musical groups from Shibuya
Performing groups established in 1911
Video game musicians
Symphony orchestras